International Union of Exhibitions and Fairs (IUEF) is an association of the leading exhibition centres and trade show related companies from Russia, Armenia, Belarus, Moldova, Ukraine, Lithuania, Kazakhstan, United Kingdom. It was founded in 1991.

External links
IUEF website
International Art Exhibition

Event management
International trade associations